is a former Japanese football player.

Playing career
Matsuoka was born in Hyogo Prefecture on July 29, 1977. After graduating from high school, he joined Japan Football League club Vissel Kobe in 1996. The club won the champions in 1996 and was promoted to J1 League from 1997. However he could hardly play in the match and retired end of 1997 season.

Club statistics

References

External links

1977 births
Living people
Association football people from Hyōgo Prefecture
Japanese footballers
J1 League players
Japan Football League (1992–1998) players
Vissel Kobe players
Association football forwards